Cho Bum-hyun (born October 1, 1960) is the former manager of the KT Wiz, and a former catcher in the Korea Baseball Organization.

References

External links 
 Career statistics and player information from Korea Baseball Organization

Asian Games baseball managers
Kia Tigers managers
Kia Tigers coaches
Samsung Lions coaches
Doosan Bears players
Samsung Lions players
SSG Landers managers
KT Wiz managers
KBO League catchers
South Korean baseball managers
South Korean baseball coaches
South Korean baseball players
Korea University alumni
1960 births
Living people
South Korea national baseball team managers